Wilton Norman Chamberlain (August 21, 1936 – October 12, 1999) was an American professional basketball player who played at the center position. Several players and publications have argued that Chamberlain is the greatest of all time. He holds numerous NBA regular season records in scoring, rebounding, and durability categories; blocks were not counted during his career. He was enshrined into the Naismith Memorial Basketball Hall of Fame in 1978, and elected to the NBA's 35th, 50th, and 75th anniversary teams. After his professional basketball career ended, Chamberlain played volleyball in the short-lived International Volleyball Association (IVA). He was also once league president, and is enshrined in the IVA Hall of Fame for his contributions. Renowned for his strength, he appeared as the antagonist in the 1984 Arnold Schwarzenegger film Conan the Destroyer. Chamberlain was also a lifelong bachelor and became notorious for his statement of having had sexual relations with as many as 20,000 women.

Chamberlain holds 72 NBA records, so many that it led former teammate Billy Cunningham to remark “The NBA Guide reads like Wilt's personal diary."  He is best remembered as the only player to score 100 points in a single NBA game. He is also the only one to average 50 points in a season, or to gather 55 rebounds in a game. He also never fouled out of a game; and is the only player in NBA history to average at least 30 points and 20 rebounds per game in a season, a feat he accomplished seven times. Chamberlain ultimately won two NBA championships, four regular-season Most Valuable Player (MVP) awards, the Rookie of the Year award, one Finals MVP award, and one All-Star Game MVP award, and he was selected to thirteen All-Star Games and ten All-NBA Teams (seven First and three Second teams). He won seven scoring, eleven rebounding, nine durability, and nine field goal percentage titles; and he once led the league in assists.  

Chamberlain played in college for the Kansas Jayhawks, and led Kansas to the national championship game, but lost to the North Carolina Tar Heels in triple overtime. He also played for the Harlem Globetrotters before joining the NBA, where he played for the Philadelphia / San Francisco Warriors, the Philadelphia 76ers, and the Los Angeles Lakers. Chamberlain had an on-court rivalry with Boston Celtics' center Bill Russell, suffering a long string of losses. Chamberlain, always a poor free throw shooter, battled the "loser" label, before finally breaking through and winning the 1967 NBA Finals as a member of the 76ers. Chamberlain won his second championship as a member of the 1972 Lakers, a team which set a record with a 33-game winning streak.

Chamberlain was known to sportswriters by several nicknames during his playing career, calling attention to his great height since his high school days. He disliked the ones that portrayed his height negatively, such as "Wilt the Stilt" and "Goliath". He personally preferred "The Big Dipper", which was inspired by his friends who saw him dip his head as he walked through doorways. The name was retained in one of Chamberlain's signature moves, the "dipper dunk". He was also one of the first players to make prominent use of shots like the fade away jump shot and the finger roll. His success near the basket led to the widening of the lane, offensive goaltending rules, and it being illegal to inbound over the backboard. His ability to leap from the foul line led to the rule that a free throw shooter must keep his feet behind the line.

Early years
Chamberlain was born on August 21, 1936, in Philadelphia, Pennsylvania, into a family of nine children, the son of Olivia Ruth Johnson, a domestic worker and homemaker, and William Chamberlain, a welder, custodian, and handyman. He was a frail child, nearly dying of pneumonia in his early years and missing a whole year of school as a result. At first, Chamberlain was not interested in basketball because he thought it was "a game for sissies". However, according to Chamberlain, "basketball was king in Philadelphia", so he eventually turned to the sport in 7th grade.

High school career

Overbrook High School (1953–1955)
Chamberlain was  when he entered Philadelphia's Overbrook High School.  As an avid track and field athlete, Chamberlain high jumped 6 feet, 6 inches, ran the 440 yards in 49.0 seconds and the 880 yards in 1:58.3, put the shot 53 feet, 4 inches, and long jumped 22 feet.   

He was the star player for the Overbrook Panthers basketball team, wearing jersey number 5. Chamberlain had a natural advantage against his peers; he soon was renowned for his scoring talent, his physical strength, and his shot-blocking abilities. According to ESPN journalist Hal Bock, Chamberlain was "scary, flat-out frightening ... before he came along, very few players at the center position possessed his level of athleticism, stature, and stamina. Chamberlain changed the game in fundamental ways no other player did." It was also in this period of his life when his three lifelong nicknames "Wilt the Stilt", "Goliath", and his favorite, "The Big Dipper", were born.

Chamberlain led the team to two city championships, and over three seasons Overbrook logged a 56–3 win-loss record. Chamberlain broke Tom Gola's Philadelphia high school scoring record and graduated with 2,252 points, averaging 37.4 points per game.

1953: City runner-up 
Chamberlain averaged 31 points a game during the 1953 high school season and led his team to a 71–62 win over Northeast High School of Guy Rodgers, Chamberlain's future NBA teammate. He scored 34 points as Overbrook won the Philadelphia Public League title and gained a berth in the city championship game against the winner of the rival Catholic league, the West Catholic High School. In that game, West Catholic quadruple-teamed Chamberlain the entire game, and despite his 29 points, the Panthers lost 54–42.

1954: City champions 
In his second Overbrook season, Chamberlain continued his prolific scoring when he tallied a high-school record 71 points against Roxborough. The Panthers comfortably won the Public League title after again beating Northeast in a game in which Chamberlain scored 40 points, and later won the city title by defeating South Catholic 74–50. He scored 32 points and led Overbrook to a 19–0 season. 

During summer vacations, Chamberlain worked as a bellhop at Kutsher's Hotel. Owners Milton and Helen Kutsher subsequently kept up a lifelong friendship with Chamberlain. Red Auerbach, the coach of the Boston Celtics,  was also athletic director of the summer basketball league at Kutscher's.  Auerbach spotted Chamberlain there and had him play one-on-one against University of Kansas (KU) standout and national champion B. H. Born, elected the NCAA Most Outstanding Player in 1953. Chamberlain won 25–10, and Born was so dejected that he gave up a promising NBA career and became a tractor engineer, recalling: "If there were high school kids that good, I figured I wasn't going to make it to the pros." Auerbach wanted Chamberlain to go to a New England university, so the Celtics could draft him as an NBA territorial pick, but Chamberlain did not respond.

1955: City champions 

In Chamberlain's third and final Overbrook season, he continued his high scoring, logging 74, 78, and 90 points in three consecutive games. The Panthers suffered just one loss, to Farrell High 59–58. Overbrook won the Public League a third time, beating West Philadelphia 78–60; in the city championship game, they met West Catholic once again. Scoring 35 points, Chamberlain led Overbrook to an 83–42 victory. He has been retroactively honored as Mr. Basketball USA for 1955, the earliest such selection.

Christian Street YMCA 
In 1953, while still a sophomore in high school, Chamberlain won his first championship. He led the Christian Street YMCA to the title in the national YMCA tournament in High Point, North Carolina, beating the local favorite and defending champion High Point team 85–79. Chamberlain was the youngest member of the team.

Quakertown Fays 
At the ages of 16 and 17, Chamberlain played several games for the semi-professional Quakertown Fays under the pseudonym George Marcus. There were contemporary reports of the games in Philadelphia publications, but he tried to keep them secret from the Amateur Athletic Union.

College career

After his last Overbrook season, more than two hundred universities tried to recruit Chamberlain. Among others, UCLA offered Chamberlain the opportunity to become a movie star, the University of Pennsylvania wanted to buy him diamonds, and Chamberlain's coach at Overbrook, Cecil Mosenson, was even offered a coaching position if he could persuade him. 

In his 2004 biography of Chamberlain Wilt: Larger than Life, Robert Allen Cherry describes that Chamberlain wanted a change and did not want to be near Philadelphia, also eliminating New York City, was not interested in New England, and snubbed the South because of racial segregation; this left the Midwest as Chamberlain's probable choice. After visiting KU and conferring with the school's renowned coach Phog Allen, Chamberlain proclaimed that he was going to play college basketball at Kansas.

University of Kansas (1956–1958) 
In 1955, Chamberlain entered University of Kansas (KU). Chamberlain was a member of Kappa Alpha Psi fraternity, where he was the president of his pledge class.  As he did at Overbrook, Chamberlain again showcased his diverse athletic talent at KU. He ran the 100-yard dash in 10.9 seconds, shot-putted 56 feet, triple jumped more than 50 feet, and won the high jump in the Big Eight Conference track and field championships three straight years.

Chamberlain's freshman team debut was highly anticipated; the freshman squad was pitted against the varsity, a team favored to win their conference that year. Chamberlain dominated his older college teammates by scoring 42 points (16–35 from the field, 10–12 on free throws), grabbing 29 rebounds, and registering 4 blocks. 

Chamberlain was the catalyst for several 1956 NCAA basketball rule changes, including the rule which requires that a shooter maintain both feet behind the line during a free-throw attempt. He reportedly had a  vertical leap, and was capable of converting foul shots by dunking, without a running start, beginning his movement just steps behind the top of the key. Inbounding the ball over the backboard was banned because of Chamberlain.   Offensive goaltending, or basket interference, was also introduced as a rule in 1956, after Bill Russell had exploited it at San Francisco and Chamberlain was soon to enter college play.

Chamberlain's prospects of playing under Allen ended when the coach turned 70 shortly after and retired in accordance with KU regulations. Cherry doubts whether Chamberlain would have chosen KU if he had known that Allen was going to retire. Chamberlain had a bad relationship with Allen's successor Dick Harp fueled by this disappointment. For many years following Chamberlain's departure from KU, critics also said that he wanted to leave the Midwest or was embarrassed by not being able to win a championship. In 1998, Chamberlain returned to Allen Fieldhouse in Lawrence, Kansas, to participate in a jersey-retiring ceremony for his  13. He said: "There's been a lot of conversation...that I have some dislike for the University of Kansas. That is totally ridiculous."

Sophomore season (1957): National runner-up to North Carolina 
On December 3, 1956, Chamberlain made his varsity basketball debut as a center for the Kansas Jayhawks. In his first game, he scored 52 points and grabbed 31 rebounds, breaking both all-time Kansas records in an 87–69 win against the Northwestern Wildcats, a team having Chamberlain's future NBA teammate Joe Ruklick. Leading a talented squad of starters, including Maurice King, Gene Elstun, John Parker, Ron Lonesky, and Lew Johnson, the Jayhawks went 13–1 until they lost a game 56–54 versus the Oklahoma State Cowboys, a team holding the ball the last three and a half minutes without any intention of scoring a basket, which was still possible in the days before the shot clock (introduced 1984 in the NCAA).  

Chamberlain was named first-team All-American. Teammate Monte Johnson stated that Chamberlain had "unbelievable endurance and speed ... and was never tired. When he dunked, he was so fast that a lot of players got their fingers jammed [between Chamberlain's hand and the rim]."  By this time, several aspects of his game were already developed, such as his finger roll, his fadeaway jump shot which he could also make as a bank shot, his passing, and his shot-blocking.  

Twenty-three teams were selected to play in the 1957 NCAA basketball tournament. The Midwest Regional was held in Dallas, Texas, which at the time was segregated. In the first game, the Jayhawks played the all-white SMU Mustangs, and KU player John Parker later said: "The crowd was brutal. We were spat on, pelted with debris, and subjected to the vilest racial epithets possible." KU won 73–65 in overtime, after which police had to escort the Jayhawks out. The next game against Oklahoma City was equally unpleasant, with KU winning 81–61.

In the semi-finals, Chamberlain's Jayhawks handily defeated the two-time defending national champions San Francisco Dons 80–56, with Chamberlain scoring 32 points, grabbing 11 rebounds, and having at least seven blocked shots, as the game film is unclear whether an 8th block occurred, or the ball just fell short due to Chamberlain's intimidation. His performance led Kansas to an insurmountable lead, and he rested on the bench for the final 3:45 remaining in the game. 

The NCAA finals thus pitted 2nd-ranked Kansas led by Chamberlain against the 1st-ranked, undefeated North Carolina Tar Heels, led by All-American and National Player of the Year Lennie Rosenbluth. In that game, Tar Heels coach Frank McGuire used several unorthodox tactics to thwart Chamberlain. For the tip-off, he sent his shortest player Tommy Kearns in order to rattle Chamberlain and the Tar Heels spent the rest of the night triple-teaming him, one defender in front, one behind, and a third arriving as soon as he got the ball. With the Tar Heels' fixation on Chamberlain, the Jayhawks shot only 27% from the field, as opposed to 64% of the Tar Heels, and trailed 22–29 at halftime. With 10 minutes to go, North Carolina led 40–37  and stalled the game, as they passed the ball around without any intention of scoring a basket. After several Tar Heel turnovers, the game was tied at 46 at the end of regulation.  

Each team scored two points in the first overtime, while Kansas froze the ball in return, keeping the game tied at 48, in the second overtime. In the third overtime, the Tar Heels scored two consecutive baskets, but Chamberlain executed a three-point play, leaving KU trailing 52–51. After King scored a basket, Kansas was ahead by one point. With 10 seconds remaining, Tar Heels' center Joe Quigg pump faked then drove to the basket. Chamberlain blocked Quigg's shot but was also called for the foul. Quigg made his two foul shots to put the Tar Heels up 54–53. For the final play, Harp called for Ron Loneski to pass the ball into Chamberlain in the low post, but the pass was tipped by Quigg and recovered by Kearns and the Tar Heels won the game. 

Despite the loss, Chamberlain, who scored 23 points and 14 rebounds, was elected the Most Outstanding Player of the Final Four. Cherry comments that this loss was a watershed in Chamberlain's life because it was the first time that his team lost despite him putting up impressive individual basketball statistics. He later admitted that this loss was the most painful of his life. It is considered one of the sport's greatest games. It was North Carolina's first of six NCAA national titles. It was also the first national final to go into overtime; and is still the only one to go into triple overtime.

Junior season (1958) 
In Chamberlain's junior season of 1957–58, the Jayhawks' matches were even more frustrating for him. Knowing how good he was, the opponents resorted to freeze-ball tactics and routinely used three or more players to guard him. Teammate Bob Billings commented: "It was not fun basketball ... we were just out chasing people throwing the basketball back and forth." Chamberlain averaged 30.1 points for the season and led the Jayhawks to an 18–5 record, with three of the losses coming while he was out with a urinary infection. Because KU came second in the league and at the time only conference winners were invited to the NCAA tournament, the Jayhawks' season ended. It was a small consolation that he was again named an All-American, along with future NBA Hall-of-Famers Elgin Baylor of Seattle University and Oscar Robertson of Cincinnati, plus Chamberlain's old rival Guy Rodgers, now playing for Temple University. 

Having lost the enjoyment from NCAA basketball and wanting to earn money, he left college and sold the story named "Why I Am Leaving College" to Look for $10,000, a large sum when NBA players earned $9,000 in a whole season. In two seasons at KU, he averaged 29.9 points and 18.3 rebounds per game, while totaling 1,433 points and 877 rebounds, and led Kansas to one Big Seven championship. By the time Chamberlain was 21, before he even turned professional, he had already been featured in Time, Life, Look, and Newsweek.

Professional career

Harlem Globetrotters (1958–1959)
After his frustrating junior year, Chamberlain wanted to become a professional player. At that time, the NBA did not accept players until after their college graduating class had been completed; he decided to play for the Harlem Globetrotters in 1958 for a sum of $50,000, The team enjoyed a sold-out tour of the Soviet Union in 1959. They were greeted by General Secretary Nikita Khrushchev prior to the start of a game at Moscow's Lenin Central Stadium. One particular Globetrotter skit involved captain Meadowlark Lemon collapsing to the ground, and instead of helping him up, Chamberlain threw him several feet high up in the air and caught him like a doll. The 210-pound Lemon later recounted how Chamberlain was "the strongest athlete who ever lived".

In later years, Chamberlain frequently joined the Globetrotters in the off-season and fondly recalled his time there because he was no longer jeered at or asked to break records but just one of several artists who loved to entertain the crowd. On March 9, 2000, his No. 13 was retired by the Globetrotters.

Philadelphia/San Francisco Warriors (1959–1965)
On October 24, 1959, Chamberlain made his NBA debut, starting for the Philadelphia Warriors. Chamberlain became the NBA's highest paid player when he signed for $30,000, in his rookie contract. In comparison, the previous top earner was Bob Cousy of the Celtics with $25,000, the same figure Eddie Gottlieb used to buy the Warriors franchise in 1952.

1959–60 NBA season: MVP,  All-Star Game MVP and Rookie of the Year

In the 1959–60 NBA season, Chamberlain joined a Philadelphia Warriors squad that was coached by Neil Johnston and included Hall-of-Famers guard Tom Gola and forward "Pitchin'" Paul Arizin, plus Ernie Beck and Guy Rodgers; remarkably, all five starters were Philadelphians. In his first NBA game, against the New York Knicks, the rookie Chamberlain scored 43 points and grabbed 28 rebounds. In his third game, Chamberlain recorded 41 points and a then-career-high 40 rebounds in a 124–113 win over the visiting Syracuse Nationals. In his fourth game, Philadelphia met the reigning champions, the Boston Celtics of Hall-of-Fame coach Auerbach, whose offer he had snubbed several years before, and Bill Russell, who was lauded as one of the best defensive pivots in the game. 

In what was the first of many match-ups, Chamberlain outscored Russell with 30 points versus 28 points but Boston won the game, and the Chamberlain–Russell rivalry (see below) would grow to become one of the NBA's greatest of all time. On November 10, 1959, Chamberlain recorded 39 points and a new career-high 43 rebounds in a 126–125 win over the visiting Knicks. On January 25, 1960, Chamberlain recorded a rare feat in the NBA, posting at least 50 points and 40 rebounds in an NBA game. During the game against the Detroit Pistons, Chamberlain recorded 58 points, 42 rebounds, and 4 assists in a winning effort. His 58 points were a then-career-high for him, and he later tied that on February 21, as he recorded 58 points to go along with 24 rebounds in a 131–121 over the visiting Knicks.

In his first NBA season, Chamberlain averaged 37.6 points and 27 rebounds, convincingly breaking the previous regular-season records as a rookie. He needed only 56 games to score 2,102 points, which broke the all-time regular-season scoring record of Bob Pettit, who needed 72 games to score 2,101 points. Chamberlain broke eight NBA records, and he was named both Rookie of the Year and MVP that season. Chamberlain capped off his rookie season with a selection to the Eastern Conference All-Star team, winning the All-Star Game and the All-Star Game MVP award with a 23-point, 25-rebound performance.

The Warriors entered the 1960 NBA playoffs and beat the Syracuse Nationals, setting up a meeting versus the Eastern Division champions, the Celtics. Cherry describes how Celtics coach Auerbach ordered his forward Tom Heinsohn to commit personal fouls on Chamberlain; whenever the Warriors shot foul shots, Heinsohn grabbed and shoved Chamberlain to prevent him from running back quickly. His intention was that the Celtics would throw the ball in so fast that the prolific shot-blocker Chamberlain was not yet back under his own basket, and Boston could score an easy fastbreak basket. The teams split the first two games, but Chamberlain got fed up with Heinsohn and punched him during Game 3. In the scuffle, Chamberlain injured his hand, and Philadelphia lost the next two games. In Game 5, with his hand healthy, Chamberlain recorded 50 points and 35 rebounds in a 128–107 win over the Celtics, extending the series to a Game 6. In Game 6, Heinsohn scored the decisive basket with a last-second tip-in, as the Warriors lost the series 4–2.

The rookie Chamberlain then shocked Warriors' fans by saying he was thinking of retiring. He was tired of being double-teamed, or even triple-teamed, and of teams coming down on him with hard personal fouls. Chamberlain feared he might lose his cool one day. Celtics forward Heinsohn said: "Half the fouls against him were hard fouls ... he took the most brutal pounding of any player ever." Gottlieb coaxed Chamberlain back into the NBA, sweetening his return with a salary raise to $65,000,

1960–61 NBA season: Scoring, rebounding, durability, and field goal titles
Chamberlain's 1960–61 NBA season started with a 42-point and 31-rebound performance in a 133–123 road win against the Syracuse Nationals. On November 24, 1960, Chamberlain grabbed an NBA-record 55 rebounds, along with 34 points and 4 assists, in a 132–129 home loss against the Russell-led Boston Celtics. On November 29, Chamberlain recorded 44 points, 38 rebounds, and a then-career-high 7 assists in a 122–121 road win over the Los Angeles Lakers.

Chamberlain surpassed his rookie season statistics, as he averaged 38.4 points and 27.2 rebounds per game. He became the first player to break the 3,000-point barrier, and the first and still only player to break the 2,000-rebound barrier for a single season, grabbing 2,149 boards. Chamberlain won his first field goal percentage title and was so dominant that he scored almost 32% of his team's points and collected 30.4% of their rebounds. Chamberlain failed to convert his play into team success, this time bowing out against the Nationals in a three-game sweep. Cherry comments that Chamberlain was "difficult" and did not respect coach Johnston, who was unable to handle the star center. In retrospect, Gottlieb remarked: "My mistake was not getting a strong-handed coach. ... [Johnston] wasn't ready for big time."

1961–62 NBA season: 100-point game and 42-point All-Star Game record 
In the 1961–62 NBA season, the Warriors were coached by Frank McGuire, the coach who had masterminded Chamberlain's triple overtime loss in the NCAA championship against the Tar Heels. In that year, Chamberlain set several all-time records which have never been threatened, as he averaged 50.4 points and grabbed 25.7 rebounds per game. 

Chamberlain's 4,029 regular-season points made him the only player to break the 4,000-point barrier. Chamberlain once again broke the 2,000-rebound barrier with 2,052.  Additionally, he was on the hardwood for an average of 48.53 minutes, playing 3,882 of his team's 3,890 minutes. Because Chamberlain played in overtime games, he averaged more minutes per game than the regulation 48 and would have reached the 3,890-minute mark if he had not been ejected in one game after picking up a second technical foul with eight minutes left to play. 

On March 2, 1962, in Hershey, Pennsylvania, Chamberlain scored 100 points; he shot 36 of 63 from the field and made 28 of 32 free throws against the New York Knicks. Joe Ruklick got the assist for Wilt's 100th point. 

In addition to Chamberlain's regular-season accomplishments, he scored 42 points in the All-Star Game. In the playoffs, the Warriors again met the Boston Celtics in the Eastern Division Finals, and this season was called by both Cousy and Russell the greatest Celtics team of all time. Each team won their home games, so the series was split at three after six games. In a closely contested Game 7, Chamberlain tied the game at 107 with 16 seconds to go, but Celtics shooting guard Sam Jones hit a clutch shot with two seconds left to win the series for Boston. In later years, Chamberlain was criticized for averaging 50 points but not winning a title. In his defense, coach McGuire said that "Wilt has been simply super-human" and commented on how the Warriors lacked a consistent second scorer, a playmaker, and a second big man to take pressure off Chamberlain.

1962–63 NBA season: Individual success, move to San Francisco, and playoff miss
In the 1962–63 NBA season, Gottlieb sold the Warriors franchise for $850,000, to a group of businessmen led by Franklin Mieuli from San Francisco and the team relocated to become the San Francisco Warriors under new coach Bob Feerick. This also meant that the Warriors team broke apart, as Arizin chose to retire rather than move away from his family and his job at IBM in Philadelphia, Warrior coach McGuire chose to resign rather than move to the West Coast, and Gola was homesick, requesting a trade to the lowly New York Knicks halfway through the season. With both secondary scorers gone, Chamberlain continued his array of statistical feats, averaging 44.8 points and 24.3 rebounds per game that year. Despite his individual success, the Warriors lost 49 of their 80 games and missed the playoffs.

1963–64 NBA season: First NBA Finals loss to the Celtics
In the 1963–64 NBA season, Chamberlain got yet another new coach in Alex Hannum and was joined by promising rookie center Nate Thurmond, who eventually entered the Hall of Fame. Ex-soldier Hannum, who later entered the Basketball Hall of Fame as a coach, was a crafty psychologist who emphasized defense and passing. Most importantly, he was not afraid to stand up to the dominant Chamberlain, who was known to not communicate with coaches he did not like. Backed up by valuable rookie Thurmond, Chamberlain recorded 36.9 points and 22.3 rebounds per game, and the Warriors went all the way to the NBA Finals. In that series, they again succumbed to Russell's Boston Celtics, this time losing 4–1. Cherry says not only Chamberlain but Hannum in particular deserved much credit because he had basically had taken the bad 31–49 squad of last year, plus Thurmond, and made it into an NBA Finals contender.

In the summer of 1964, Chamberlain, one of the prominent participants at the famed Rucker Park basketball court in New York City, made the acquaintance of a tall, talented 17-year-old who played there. The young Lew Alcindor was soon allowed into his inner circle and quickly idolized the ten-year older Chamberlain. The two would later develop an intense rivalry and personal antipathy.

Philadelphia 76ers (1965–1968)

1964–65 NBA season: Trade to the 76ers, Division Finals loss to the Celtics
In the 1964–65 NBA season, the NBA widened the lane from 12 feet to 16 feet especially because of centers like Chamberlain. The Warriors got off to a terrible start to the season, and ran into financial trouble.  At the 1965 All-Star Weekend, Chamberlain was traded to the Philadelphia 76ers. While Chamberlain was from Philadelphia, this was the new name of the relocated Syracuse Nationals, a former rival. He did not care for the Sixers' coach Dolph Schayes because in his view Schayes had made several disrespectful remarks when they were rival players. In return, the Warriors received Paul Neumann, Connie Dierking, and Lee Shaffer, who opted to retire rather than report to the Warriors, plus $150,000. When Chamberlain left the Warriors, owner Franklin Mieuli said: "Chamberlain is not an easy man to love ... the fans in San Francisco never learned to love him. Wilt is easy to hate ... people came to see him lose."

Despite some reluctance, after the trade, Chamberlain found himself on a promising Sixers team that included veteran shooting guard Hal Greer, a future Hall-of-Famer, and talented role players in point guard Larry Costello, small forward Chet Walker, and centers Johnny "Red" Kerr and Lucious Jackson.  The team also featured an All-Rookie forward Billy Cunningham in the new sixth man role. Cherry notes that there was a certain tension within the team, as Greer was the formerly undisputed leader and was not willing to give up his authority, and Jackson, a talented center, was now forced to play power forward because Chamberlain occupied the center spot; however, as the season progressed, the three began to mesh better.

Statistically, Chamberlain was again outstanding, posting 34.7 points and 22.9 rebounds per game overall for the season. Future Georgetown coach John Thompson, then a rookie for the Boston Celtics, elbowed Chamberlain in the face and broke his nose, causing him to wear a face mask in several games. After defeating the Cincinnati Royals led by his fellow All-American Robertson in the playoffs, the Sixers met Chamberlain's familiar rival, the Boston Celtics. The press called it an even matchup in all positions, even at center, where Russell was expected to give Chamberlain a tough battle. The two teams split the first six games and the last game was held in the Celtics' Boston Garden because of the better season record. In that Game 7, Chamberlain scored 30 points and 32 rebounds, while Russell logged 16 points, 27 rebounds, and eight assists.

In the final minute, Chamberlain hit two clutch free throws and slam dunked on Russell, bringing Boston's lead down to 110–109 with five seconds left. Russell botched the inbounds pass, hitting a guy-wire supporting the backboard, and giving the ball back to the Sixers. Coach Schayes called timeout and decided it would be unwise to pass the ball to Chamberlain, because he feared the Celtics would intentionally foul him. Red Kerr set a pick on Sam Jones to free Chet Walker. When Greer attempted to inbound the ball to Walker, John Havlicek stole it to preserve the Celtics' lead. For the fifth time in seven years, Russell's team deprived Chamberlain of the title. According to Chamberlain, that was the time that people started calling him a loser. In an April 1965 issue of Sports Illustrated, Chamberlain conducted an interview titled "My Life in a Bush League" where he criticized his fellow players, coaches, and NBA administrators. Chamberlain later commented that he could see in hindsight how the interview was instrumental in damaging his public image.

1965–66 NBA season: MVP and second Division Finals loss to the Celtics
In the 1965–66 NBA season, the Sixers experienced tragedy when Ike Richman, the Sixers' co-owner as well as Chamberlain's confidant and lawyer, died of a heart attack while attending a road game in Boston. The Sixers would post a 55–25 regular-season record, as Chamberlain won his second MVP award. In that season, Chamberlain again dominated his opposition by recording 33.5 points and 24.6 rebounds a game, leading the league in both categories. In one particular game, Chamberlain blocked a dunk attempt by Baltimore Bullets player Gus Johnson so hard that he dislocated Johnson's shoulder.

Off the court, Chamberlain's commitment to the team was doubted, as Chamberlain was a late sleeper, lived in New York City, preferring to commute to Philadelphia rather than live there, and he was only available during the afternoon for training. Because Schayes did not want to risk angering his best player, he scheduled the daily workout at 4 pm. This angered the team, who preferred an early schedule to have the afternoon off, but Schayes just said: "There is no other way." Irv Kosloff, who owned the Sixers alone after Richman's death, pleaded with Wilt to move to Philadelphia during the season, but was turned down.

In the playoffs, the Sixers again met the Boston Celtics and had home-court advantage for the first time. Boston won the first two games on the road, winning 115–96 and 114–93; while Chamberlain played within his usual range, his supporting cast shot under 40%. This caused sports journalist Joe McGinnis to comment: "The Celtics played like champions and the Sixers just played." In Game 3, he scored 31 points and 27 rebounds for the road win. When coach Schayes planned to hold a joint team practice the next day, Chamberlain said that he was too tired to attend, and he refused Schayes' plea to at least show up and shoot a few foul shots with the team. In Game 4, Boston won 114–108. Prior to Game 5, Chamberlain skipped practice and was non-accessible. Outwardly, Schayes defended him as "excused from practice", while his teammates knew the truth and were much less forgiving. In Game 5, Chamberlain scored 46 points and grabbed 34 rebounds, but the Celtics won the game 120–112 and the series. Cherry is critical of Chamberlain because, while conceding he was the only Sixers player who performed in the series, he says his unprofessional, egotistical behavior set a bad example for his teammates.

1966–67 NBA season: Back-to-back MVP and first NBA title
Prior to the 1966–67 NBA season, Schayes was replaced by a familiar face, the more assertive Alex Hannum. In what Cherry calls a tumultuous locker room meeting, Hannum addressed several key issues he observed during the last season, several of them putting Chamberlain in an unfavorable light. Sixers forward Walker testified that on several occasions, players had to pull Chamberlain and Hannum apart to prevent a fistfight. Cunningham commented that Hannum "never backed down" and "showed who was the boss". By doing this, he won Chamberlain's respect. When emotions cooled off, Hannum said to Chamberlain that he was on the same page in trying to win a title but Chamberlain had to "act like a man" both on and off the court to pull this off. Concerning basketball, he persuaded him to change his style of play. Loaded with several other players who could score, Hannum wanted Chamberlain to concentrate more on defense. Kerr was traded to the Baltimore Bullets for point guard Wali Jones, and shooting guard Matt Guokas was selected in the first round of the 1966 NBA Draft.

As a result of his style of play change, Chamberlain averaged a career-low 24.1 points and took only 14% of the team's shots, but was extremely efficient with a record-breaking .683 field goal accuracy. He also led the league in rebounds (24.2), was third in assists (7.8), and played strong defense. His efficiency that season was reflected by a streak of 35 consecutive made field goals over the course of four games in February. For these feats, Chamberlain earned his third MVP award. The Sixers charged their way to a then-record 68–13 season, including a record 46–4 start. In addition, the formerly egotistical Chamberlain began to praise his teammates, lauding hardworking Lucious Jackson as the "ultimate power forward", calling Greer a deadly jump-shooter, and Jones an excellent defender and outsider scorer. Off the court, Chamberlain invited the team to restaurants and paid the entire bill, knowing he earned ten times more than all the others. Greer, who was considered a consummate professional and often clashed with him because of his attitude, spoke positively of the new Chamberlain: "You knew in a minute the Big Fella [Chamberlain] was ready to go ... and everybody would follow."

In the playoffs, the Sixers again battled the Boston Celtics in the Eastern Division Finals and held home-court advantage. In Game 1, the Sixers beat Boston 127–112, powered by Greer's 39 points and Chamberlain's unofficial quadruple double, with 24 points, 32 rebounds, 13 assists, and 12 unofficially counted blocks. In Game 2, the Sixers won 107–102 in overtime, and player-coach Russell grudgingly praised Chamberlain for intimidating the Celtics into taking low percentage shots from further outside. In Game 3, Chamberlain grabbed 41 rebounds and helped the Sixers win 115–104. The Celtics prevented a sweep by winning Game 4 with a 121–117 victory. As he was coming close to the first real loss of his career, Russell said: "Right now, he (Wilt) is playing like me [to win]." In Game 5, the Sixers overpowered the Celtics 140–116, ending Boston's historic run of eight consecutive NBA titles. Chamberlain scored 29 points, 36 rebounds, and 13 assists, and he was praised by the Celtics' Russell and K. C. Jones.  Philadelphia fans chanted "Boston is dead!"— the Celtics' eight-year reign as NBA champion had ended.

In the 1967 NBA Finals, the Sixers were pitted against Chamberlain's old team, the San Francisco Warriors. The Warriors were led by two future Hall-of-Famers in star forward Rick Barry and Chamberlain's one-time backup and center Nate Thurmond. The Sixers won the first two games, with Chamberlain and Greer taking credit for defense and clutch shooting, respectively, but San Francisco won two of the next three games, so Philadelphia was up 3–2 prior to Game 6. In Game 6, the Warriors were trailing 123–122 with 15 seconds left. For the last play, Thurmond and Barry were assigned to do a pick and roll against Chamberlain and Walker; however, the Sixers foiled it because Walker held up Thurmond's ability to roll, and Barry was picked up by Chamberlain, making it impossible to shoot. By the time Barry made his move, Walker recovered back to Barry, who was stuck in the air and botched the shot.  Jackson forced a jump ball on the rebound, and the Sixers won the championship. Chamberlain, who contributed with 17.7 points and 28.7 rebounds per game against Thurmond, never failing to snare at least 23 rebounds in the six games, said: "It is wonderful to be a part of the greatest team in basketball ... being a champion is like having a big round glow inside of you." The team has been ranked as one of the best in NBA history.

1967–68 NBA season: Third straight MVP and assist champion
In the 1967–68 NBA season, matters continued to turn sour between Chamberlain and Kosloff, the Sixers' sole surviving owner. This conflict had been going along for a while. In 1965, Chamberlain said that he and the late Richman had worked out a deal which would give him 25% of the franchise once he ended his career. Although there is no written proof for or against, Schayes and Sixers lawyer Alan Levitt assumed Chamberlain was correct. In any case, Kosloff declined the request, leaving Chamberlain livid and willing to jump to the rival American Basketball Association (ABA) once his contract ended in 1967. Kosloff and Chamberlain worked out a truce, and later signed a one-year, $250,000 contract.

On the hardwood, Chamberlain continued his focus on team play and registered 24.3 points and 23.8 rebounds a game for the season. On March 18, 1968, in a 158–128 victory against the Los Angeles Lakers, Chamberlain reportedly had a quintuple-double with 53 points, 32 rebounds, 14 assists, 24 blocks, and 11 steals. Chamberlain also recorded then the most points in a triple-double. The 76ers had the best record in the league for the third straight season. Chamberlain also made history by becoming the only center in NBA history to finish the season as the leader in assists, his 702 beating runner-up point guard and future Hall-of-Famer Lenny Wilkens' total by 23. Chamberlain likened his assist title to legendary home-run hitter Babe Ruth leading the league in sacrifice bunts, and felt he dispelled the myth that he could not and would not pass the ball. 

For these feats, Chamberlain won his fourth and final MVP title. Another landmark was his 25,000th point, making him the first-ever player to score that many points; he gave the ball to his team physician Stan Lorber. Winning 62 games, the Sixers easily took the first seed of the playoffs. In the Eastern Division Semifinals, they were pitted against the New York Knicks. In a physically tough matchup, the Sixers lost sixth man Cunningham with a broken hand, and Chamberlain, Greer, and Jackson were struggling with inflamed feet, bad knees, and pulled hamstrings, respectively. Going ahead 3–2, the Sixers defeated the Knicks 115–97 in Game 6 after Chamberlain scored 25 points and 27 rebounds; he had a successful series in which he led both teams in points (153), rebounds (145), and assists (38).

In the Eastern Division Finals, the Sixers met the Boston Celtics, again with home-court advantage and this time as reigning champions. Despite the Sixers' injury woes, coach Hannum was confident to "take the Celtics in less than seven games", and he referenced the age of the Celtics, a team built around Russell and Jones, both 34. On April 4, national tragedy struck with the assassination of Martin Luther King Jr. With eight of the ten starting players on the Sixers and Celtics being African-American, both teams were in deep shock, and there were calls to cancel the series. In a game called "unreal" and "devoid of emotion", the Sixers lost 127–118 on April 5. After attending the funeral, Chamberlain called out to the angry rioters who were setting fires all over the country, stating King would not have approved. In Game 2, Philadelphia evened the series with a 115–106 victory, and won Games 3 and 4, with Chamberlain suspiciously often played by Celtics backup center Wayne Embry, causing the press to speculate Russell was worn down. Prior to Game 5, the Sixers seemed poised to win the series, as no NBA team had overcome a 3–1 deficit before; however, the Celtics rallied back, winning the next two games 122–104 and 114–106, respectively, powered by a spirited John Havlicek and helped by the Sixers' bad shooting.

In Game 7, 15,202 stunned Philadelphia fans witnessed a 100–96 defeat for the Sixers, making it the first time in NBA history that a team lost a series after leading 3–1. Cherry says that the Sixers shot badly (Greer, Jones, Walker, Jackson, and Guokas hit a combined 25 of 74 shots), while Chamberlain grabbed 34 rebounds and shot 4-of-9 for a total of 14 points. In the second half of Game 7, Chamberlain did not attempt a single shot from the field. Cherry says there is a strange pattern in that game, as in a typical Sixers game Chamberlain got the ball 60 times in the low post but only 23 times in Game 7, with seven in the third quarter and twice in the fourth quarter. Chamberlain later blamed coach Hannum for the lack of touches, a point that was conceded by Hannum. Cherry comments that Chamberlain, who always thought of himself as the best player of all time, should have been outspoken enough to demand the ball.

The loss meant that Chamberlain was 1–6 in playoff series against the Celtics. After that season, coach Hannum wanted to be closer to his family on the West Coast; he left the Sixers to coach the Oakland Oaks in the newly founded ABA. Chamberlain then asked for a trade and Sixers general manager Jack Ramsay traded him to the Los Angeles Lakers for Darrall Imhoff, Archie Clark, and Jerry Chambers. The motivation for this move remains in dispute. According to sportswriter Roland Lazenby, a journalist close to the Lakers, Chamberlain was angry at Kosloff for breaking the alleged Chamberlain–Richman deal. According to Ramsay, Chamberlain threatened to jump to the ABA after Hannum left and forced the trade. Cherry adds several personal reasons, among them Chamberlain felt he had grown too big for Philadelphia, sought the presence of fellow celebrities, which were plenty in Los Angeles, and finally also desired the opportunity to date white women, which was possible for a black man in Los Angeles but hard to imagine elsewhere back then.

Los Angeles Lakers (1968–1973)

1968–69 NBA season: Second NBA Finals loss to the Celtics
On July 9, 1968, the trade between the Los Angeles Lakers and the Sixers was completed, making it the first time a reigning NBA MVP was traded the next season. Lakers owner Jack Kent Cooke gave Chamberlain an unprecedented contract, paying him $250,000 after taxes, or about $ million in real value; in comparison, previous Lakers top earner Jerry West was paid $100,000 before taxes (about $,000 in real value).

For the 1968–69 NBA season, Chamberlain joined a squad featuring his fellow former All-American, forward Elgin Baylor, and the Hall-of-Fame guard Jerry West, along with backup center Mel Counts, forwards Keith Erickson and Tom Hawkins, and talented 5'11" guard Johnny Egan. Cherry says that Chamberlain was not a natural leader or a loyal follower, which made him difficult to fit in. While he was on cordial terms with West, he often argued with team captain Baylor, later explaining in regard to Baylor: "We were good friends, but ... [in] black culture ... you never let the other guy one-up you." 

The lack of a second guard next to West, and the lack of speed and quickness, concerned coach Butch van Breda Kolff. After losing Clark and Gail Goodrich, who joined the Phoenix Suns after the 1968 NBA expansion draft, he said: "Egan gets murdered on defense because of his [lack of] size ... but if I don't play him, we look like a bunch of trucks." The greatest problem was his tense relationship with Van Breda Kolff. Pejoratively calling the new recruit "The Load", he later complained that Chamberlain was egotistical, never respected him, too often slacked off in practice, and focused too much on his own statistics. Chamberlain described Van Breda Kolff as "the dumbest and worst coach ever". Erickson commented that "Butch catered to Elgin and Jerry ... and that is not a good way to get on Wilt's side ... that relationship was doomed from the start."

Chamberlain experienced an often-frustrating season. Van Breda Kolff benched him several times, which never happened in his career before; in mid-season, Chamberlain, a perennial scoring champion, had two games in which he scored only six and then only two points. Playing through his problems, Chamberlain averaged 20.5 points and 21.1 rebounds a game that season. Cooke was pleased because ticket sales went up by 11% since acquiring Chamberlain. 

In the playoffs, the Lakers dispatched 4–2 Chamberlain's old club, the San Francisco Warriors, after losing the first two games, and then defeated the Atlanta Hawks, and met Chamberlain's familiar rivals, Russell's Boston Celtics. Going into the NBA Finals as 3-to-1 favorites, the Lakers won the first two games but dropped the next two. Chamberlain was criticized as a non-factor in the series, getting neutralized by Russell with little effort. In Game 5, Chamberlain scored 13 points and grabbed 31 rebounds, leading Los Angeles to a 117–104 win. In Game 6, in which Chamberlain recorded 18 rebounds and 4 assists but only 8 points, the Celtics won 99–90. Cherry criticizes his performance, saying that if "Chamberlain had come up big and put up a normal 30 point scoring night", the Lakers would have probably won their first championship at Los Angeles.

Game 7 featured a surreal scene because Cooke put up thousands of balloons in the rafters of the Forum in Los Angeles in anticipation of a Lakers win. This display of arrogance motivated the Celtics. In Game 7, the Lakers trailed 91–76 after three quarters. The Lakers mounted a comeback, but then Chamberlain twisted his knee after a rebound and had to be replaced by Counts. With three minutes to go, the Lakers trailed 103–102, but they committed costly turnovers and lost the game 108–106, despite a triple-double from West, who had 42 points, 13 rebounds, and 12 assists, and became the only player in NBA history to be named Finals MVP despite being on the losing team. 

After the game, many wondered why Chamberlain sat out the final six minutes. At the time of his final substitution, he had scored 18 points (hitting seven of his eight shots) and grabbed 27 rebounds, significantly better than the 10 points of Counts on 4-of-13 shooting. Among others, Russell did not believe Chamberlain's injury was grave and accused him of being a malingerer, stating: "Any injury short of a broken leg or a broken back is not enough." In spite of their earlier quarrels, Van Breda Kolff came to his defense, insisting the often-maligned Chamberlain hardly was able to move in the end. Van Breda Kolff was perceived as "pig-headed" for benching Chamberlain and soon resigned as Lakers coach. Cherry comments that some journalists reported how Game 7 destroyed two careers: "Wilt's because he wouldn't take over and Van Breda Kolff because he wouldn't give in."

1969–70 NBA season: First NBA Finals loss to the Knicks
In the 1969–70 NBA season, Chamberlain began the season under new coach Joe Mullaney strongly, averaging 32.2 points and 20.6 rebounds per game over the first nine games of the season. During the ninth game, he had a serious knee injury, suffering a total rupture of the patellar tendon at the base of his right kneecap, and he missed the next several months before appearing in the final three games of the 82-game regular season, the first season in which he failed to reach 20 rebounds per game. Owing to his strong start, he still managed to put up a season-average 27.3 points, 18.4 rebounds, and 4.1 assists per game.

The Lakers again charged through the playoffs, reaching the NBA Finals, where they were pitted against the New York Knicks, loaded with future Hall-of-Famers Willis Reed, Dave DeBusschere, Bill Bradley, and Walt Frazier. Cherry says that Reed, a prolific mid-range shooter, was a bad matchup for Chamberlain. Having lost lateral quickness due to his injury, Chamberlain was often too slow to block Reed's preferred high-post jump shots. In Game 1, the Knicks masterminded a 124–112 win in which Reed scored 37 points. In Game 2, Chamberlain scored 19 points, grabbed 24 rebounds, and blocked Reed's shot in the final seconds, leading the Lakers to a 105–103 win. Game 3 saw West hit a 60-foot shot at the buzzer to tie the game at 102; however, the Knicks took the game 111–108. In Game 4, Chamberlain scored 18 points and grabbed 25 rebounds and helped tie the series at 2. In Game 5, with the Knicks trailing by double digits, Reed pulled his thigh muscle and seemed to be done for the series. By conventional wisdom, Chamberlain now should have dominated against little-used Knicks backup centers Nate Bowman and Bill Hosket Jr., or forwards Bradley and DeBusschere, who gave up more than half a foot against him. Instead, the Lakers gave away their 13-point halftime lead and succumbed to the aggressive Knicks defense, as they committed 19 second-half turnovers, and the two main scorers (Chamberlain and West) shot the ball in the entire second half only three and two times, respectively. The Lakers lost 107–100 in what was called one of the greatest comebacks in NBA Finals history.

In Game 6, Chamberlain scored 45 points, grabbed 27 rebounds, and almost single-handedly equalized the series in a 135–113 Lakers win, and with Reed out, the Knicks seemed doomed prior to Game 7 in New York City; however, the hero of that Game 7 was Reed, who famously hobbled up court, scored the first four points, and inspired his team to one of the most famous playoff upsets of all time. The Knicks led by 27 at halftime, and despite scoring 21 points, Chamberlain could not prevent a third consecutive loss in Game 7. Chamberlain was criticized for his inability to dominate his injured counterpart but Cherry says that his feat, coming back from a career-threatening injury, was too quickly forgotten.

1970–71 NBA season: Conference Finals loss and challenge to Muhammad Ali

In the 1970–71 NBA season, the Lakers made a notable move by signing future Hall-of-Fame guard Gail Goodrich, who came back from the Suns after playing for the Lakers until 1968. Chamberlain averaged 20.7 points, 18.2 rebounds, and 4.3 assists, once again led the NBA in rebounding, and the Lakers won the Pacific Division title. When Hall-of-Fame Detroit Pistons center Bob Lanier, who was 6 feet 11 inches and 250 pounds as a rookie, was asked about the most memorable moment of his career, Lanier answered: "When Wilt Chamberlain lifted me up and moved me like a coffee cup so he could get a favorable position."

After losing Baylor to an Achilles tendon rupture that effectively ended his career, and especially after losing West after a knee injury, the handicapped Lakers were seen as underdogs in the playoffs against the Milwaukee Bucks of Alcindor, freshly crowned MVP, and the veteran Hall-of-Fame guard Robertson, whom they faced in the Western Conference Finals. Winning the regular season with 66 wins, the Bucks were seen as favorites against the depleted Lakers; still, many pundits were looking forward to the matchup between the 34-year-old Chamberlain and the 24-year-old Alcindor. In Game 1, Alcindor outscored Chamberlain 32–22, and the Bucks won 106–85. In Game 2, the Bucks won again despite Chamberlain scoring 26 points, four more than his Milwaukee counterpart. Prior to Game 3, things became even worse for the Lakers when Erickson, West's stand-in, had an appendectomy and was out for the season. With rookie Jim McMillian easing the scoring pressure, Chamberlain scored 24 points and grabbed 24 rebounds in a 118–107 victory, but the Bucks defeated the Lakers 117–94 in Game 4 to take a 3–1 series lead. Milwaukee closed out the series at home with a 116–98 victory in Game 5. Although Chamberlain lost, he was lauded for holding his own against MVP Alcindor, who was not only 10 years younger but healthy.

After the playoffs, Chamberlain challenged heavyweight boxing legend Muhammad Ali to a fight. The 15-round bout would have taken place on July 26, 1971, in the Houston Astrodome. Chamberlain trained with Cus d'Amato but later backed out, withdrawing the much-publicized challenge, by way of a contractual escape clause that predicated the Ali–Chamberlain match on Ali beating Joe Frazier in a fight scheduled for early 1971, which became  Ali's first professional loss, enabling Chamberlain to legally withdraw from the bout. In a 1999 interview, Chamberlain stated that D'Amato had twice before, in 1965 and 1967, approached him with the idea, and that he and Ali had each been offered $5 million for the bout. For his part, Ali refused to be intimidated at this potentially formidable opponent and instead played psychological games to weaken Chamberlain's confidence with public boasts of "Timber!" and "The tree will fall!" In 1965, Chamberlain had consulted his father, who had seen Ali fight, and said no. Cooke had offered Chamberlain a record-setting contract on the condition that he agreed to give up what Cooke termed "this boxing foolishness". In 1967, retired NFL star Jim Brown acted as Chamberlain's manager; Ali's manager Jabir Herbert Muhammad backed out of the Ali–Chamberlain match, which was slated to take place at Madison Square Garden.

1971–72 NBA season: Finals MVP and second NBA title
In the 1971–72 NBA season, the Lakers hired former Celtics star guard Bill Sharman as head coach. Sharman introduced morning shoot-arounds, in which the perennial latecomer Chamberlain regularly participated, in contrast to earlier years with Schayes, and transformed him into a defensive-minded, low-scoring post defender in the mold of his old rival Russell. Furthermore, he told Chamberlain to use his rebounding and passing skills to quickly initiate fastbreaks to his teammates. While no longer being the main scorer, Chamberlain was named the new captain of the Lakers. After rupturing his Achilles tendon, perennial captain Baylor retired, leaving a void Chamberlain filled. Initially, Sharman wanted Chamberlain and West to share this duty, but West declined, stating he was injury-prone and wanted to solely concentrate on the game. Chamberlain accepted his new roles and posted an all-time low 14.8 points per game but also won the rebound crown with 19.2 rebounds per game and led the league with a .649 field goal percentage. Powered by his defensive presence, the Lakers embarked on an unprecedented 33-game win streak en route to a then-record 69 wins in the regular season, yet the streak led to one strangely dissonant event. According to Flynn Robinson, after the record-setting streak, Lakers owner Cooke sought to reward each of his players, who were expecting perhaps a trip to Hawaii, with a $5 pen set. In response, Chamberlain had everybody put all the pens in the middle of the floor and stepped on them.

In the playoffs, the Lakers swept the Chicago Bulls, then went on to face the Milwaukee Bucks of young center and regular-season MVP Kareem Abdul-Jabbar (formerly Lew Alcindor). The matchup between Chamberlain and Abdul-Jabbar was hailed by Life as the greatest matchup in all of sports. Chamberlain would help lead the Lakers past Abdul-Jabbar and the Bucks in six games. Particularly, Chamberlain was lauded for his performance in Game 6, which the Lakers won 104–100 after trailing by 10 points in the fourth quarter; Chamberlain scored 24 points and 22 rebounds, played all 48 minutes, and outsprinted the younger Bucks center on several late Lakers fast breaks. West called it "the greatest ball-busting performance I have ever seen". Chamberlain performed so well in the series that Time stated: "In the N.B.A.'s western division title series with Milwaukee, he (Chamberlain) decisively outplayed basketball's newest giant superstar, Kareem Abdul-Jabbar, eleven years his junior."

In the NBA Finals, the Lakers again met the New York Knicks, a team that was shorthanded after losing the 6'9" Reed to injury, and undersized 6'8" Jerry Lucas had the task to defend against the 7'1" Chamberlain. Prolific outside shooter Lucas helped New York to win Game 1, hitting nine of his 11 shots in the first half alone. In Game 2, which the Lakers won 106–92, Chamberlain put Lucas into foul trouble, and the Knicks lost defensive power forward Dave DeBusschere to injury. In Game 3, Chamberlain scored 26 points and grabbed 20 rebounds for another Lakers win. In a fiercely battled Game 4, Chamberlain was playing with five fouls late in the game. Having never fouled out in his career, a feat that he was very proud of, Chamberlain played aggressive defense despite the risk of fouling out, and blocked two of Lucas' shots in overtime, proving those wrong who said he only played for his own statistics; he ended scoring a game-high 27 points. In that game, he fell on his right hand and was said to have sprained it but it was actually broken. For Game 5, Chamberlain's hands were packed into thick pads normally destined for defensive linesmen in football; he was offered a painkilling shot but refused because he feared he would lose his shooting touch if his hands became numb. In Game 5, Chamberlain recorded 24 points, 29 rebounds, 8 assists, and 8 blocked shots, as announcer Keith Jackson counted the blocks during the broadcast. While blocked shots were not an official NBA statistic at that time and would not be officially counted until the season after Chamblerlain's retirement in 1973, reported data for blocked shots in 112 games played by Chamberlain in the 1970s shows he averaged 8.8 blocks per game. Chamberlain's all-around performance helped the Lakers win their first championship in Los Angeles with a decisive 114–100 win. Chamberlain was named the NBA Finals MVP, and he was admired for dominating the Knicks in Game 5 while playing injured.

1972–73 NBA season: Second NBA Finals loss to the Knicks
The 1972–73 NBA season was to be Chamberlain's last, although he did not know this at the time. In his last season, the Lakers lost substance, as Happy Hairston was injured, Robinson and LeRoy Ellis had left, and the veteran West struggled with injury. Chamberlain averaged 13.2 points and 18.6 rebounds, still enough to win the rebounding title for the 11th time in his career. In addition, he shot an NBA record 0.727 for the season, bettering his own mark of 0.683 from the 1966–67 season. It was the ninth time that Chamberlain would lead the league in field goal percentage. The Lakers won 60 games in the regular season and reached the NBA Finals against the New York Knicks, a franchise that featured a healthy team with a rejuvenated Reed, while the Lakers were now handicapped by several injuries. In that series, the Lakers started off with a 115–112 win, but the Knicks won Games 2 and 3; things worsened when West again injured his hamstring. In Game 4, the shorthanded Lakers were no match for New York. In Game 5, the valiant but injured West and Hairston had bad games, and the Lakers lost the game 102–93 and the series 3–2, despite Chamberlain scoring 23 points and grabbing 21 rebounds. After the Knicks finished off the game with a late flourish led by Phil Jackson and Earl Monroe, Chamberlain made a dunk with one second left, which turned out to be the last play of his NBA career.

Coaching career

San Diego Conquistadors (1973–1974)
In 1973, the San Diego Conquistadors of the NBA rival league ABA signed Chamberlain as a player-coach for a $600,000 salary.  Chamberlain claimed that at least part of the reason for leaving the Lakers was that he believed he had the right to renegotiate his contract after winning the 1971-72 NBA championship, and was upset that the Lakers did not contact him until September 1972, and in the meantime were trying to acquire UCLA star center Bill Walton, who ultimately decided to return to school for the 1972-73 season. The Lakers sued their former star and successfully prevented him from actually playing because he still owed them the option year of his contract.  Specifically, according to the 2 year contract that Chamberlain had signed prior to the 1971-72 season, if he failed to sign and mail back his next contract his contract with the Lakers would be deemed to be renewed.  The Lakers claimed that they mailed Chamberlain a new contract in July 1973 but Chamberlain did not sign it and so the old contract should be deemed to have been renewed for the 1973-74 season.  On October 10, 1973, the opening day of the Conquistadors season, a judge ruled that Chamberlain could coach the Conquistadors but could not play for any team other than the Lakers for 1973-74.

Barred from playing, Chamberlain mostly left the coaching duties to his assistant Stan Albeck, who recalled: "Chamberlain ... has a great feel for pro basketball ... the day-to-day things that are an important part of basketball ... just bored him. He did not have the patience." The players were split on Chamberlain, who was seen as competent but often indifferent and more occupied with promotion of his autobiography Wilt: Just Like Any Other 7-Foot Black Millionaire Who Lives Next Door than with coaching. He once skipped a game to sign autographs for the book. In his single season as a coach, the Conquistadors went a mediocre 37–47 in the regular season and lost against the Utah Stars in the Division Semifinals. After the season, Chamberlain retired from professional basketball; in addition, he was displeased by the meager attendance, as crowds averaged 1,843, just over half of the team's small Golden Hall, a 3,200-seat sports arena.

NBA career statistics

Regular season

Playoffs

Post-NBA career
After his stint with the Conquistadors, Chamberlain successfully went into business and entertainment, made money in stocks and real estate, bought a popular Harlem nightclub, which he renamed Big Wilt's Smalls Paradise, and invested in broodmares. He appeared  in ads for TWA, American Express, Volkswagen, Drexel Burnham, Le Tigre Clothing, and Foot Locker.

Athletics 
Chamberlain also sponsored his personal professional volleyball and track and field teams, and also provided high-level teams for girls and women in basketball, track, volleyball, and softball. 

Volleyball became Chamberlain's new athletic passion. Being a talented hobby volleyballer during his Lakers days, he became a board member of the newly founded International Volleyball Association (IVA) in 1974 and its president in 1975. As a testament to his importance, the IVA All-Star game was televised only because Chamberlain also played in it; he rose to the challenge and was named the game's MVP. He played occasional matches for the IVA Seattle Smashers before the league folded in 1979. Chamberlain promoted the sport so effectively that he was named to the IVA Hall of Fame, and he became one of the few athletes who were enshrined in different sports.

Starting in the 1970s, he formed Wilt's Athletic Club, a track and field club in southern California, coached by then UCLA assistant coach Bob Kersee in the early days of his career. Among the members of the team were Florence Griffith before she set the world records in the 100 meters and 200 meters, three-time world champion Greg Foster, and future Olympic Gold medalists Andre Phillips, Alice Brown, and Jeanette Bolden. In all, he claimed 60 athletes with aspirations of expanding to 100. While actively promoting the sport in 1982, Chamberlain said he was considering a return to athletic competition in masters athletics. At the time, he stated he had only been beaten in the high jump once, by Olympic champion Charles Dumas, and that he had never been beaten in the shot put, including beating Olympic legend Al Oerter.

Even far beyond his playing days, Chamberlain was a very fit person. In his mid-forties, he was able to humble rookie Magic Johnson in practice, and he flirted with making a comeback in the NBA in the 1980s. In the 1980–81 NBA season, coach Larry Brown recalled that the 45-year-old Chamberlain had received an offer from the Cleveland Cavaliers. When Chamberlain was 50, the New Jersey Nets had the same idea but were declined. He would continue to epitomize physical fitness for years to come, including participating in several marathons. When million-dollar contracts became common in the NBA, Chamberlain increasingly felt he had been underpaid during his career. A result of this resentment was the 1997 book Who's Running the Asylum? Inside the Insane World of Sports Today, in which he criticized the NBA of the 1990s for being too disrespectful of players of the past.

Film 
In 1976, Chamberlain turned to his interest in movies, forming a film production and distribution company to make his first film, entitled Go For It. Chamberlain played a villainous warrior and counterpart of Arnold Schwarzenegger in the 1984 film Conan the Destroyer. In November 1998, he signed with Ian Ng Cheng Hin, CEO of Northern Cinema House Entertainment, to do his own bio-pic, wanting to tell his life story his way. He had been working on the screenplay notes for over a year at the time of his death.

Death
Chamberlain had a history of cardiovascular disease, and was briefly hospitalized in 1992 for an irregular heartbeat. According to those close to him, he eventually began taking medication for his heart troubles. His condition deteriorated rapidly in 1999 and he lost . After undergoing dental surgery in the week before his death, he was in great pain and seemed unable to recover from the stress. On October 12, 1999, Chamberlain died at age 63 at his home in Bel Air. His longtime attorney Sy Goldberg stated Chamberlain died of congestive heart failure. Goldberg also said: "He was more inquisitive than anybody I ever knew. He was writing a screenplay about his life. He was interested in world affairs, sometimes he'd call me up late at night and discuss philosophy. I think he'll be remembered as a great man. He happened to make a living playing basketball, but he was more than that. He could talk on any subject. He was a Goliath."

Several NBA players and officials were saddened at the loss of a player they remembered as one of the greatest players in the history of the sport. On-court rival and personal friend Bill Russell stated, "the fierceness of our competition bonded us together for eternity."

Legacy

Awards and honors

Chamberlain is regarded as one of the most extraordinary and dominant basketball players in the history of the NBA, often being debated as the greatest NBA player of all time — even ahead of Michael Jordan. Contemporary colleagues were often terrified to play against Chamberlain. Russell regularly feared being embarrassed by Chamberlain, and Walt Frazier called his dominance on the court "comical". 

Chamberlain is holder of numerous official NBA all-time records. Former teammate Billy Cunningham remarked “The NBA Guide reads like Wilt's personal diary." He was a scoring champion, all-time top rebounder, and accurate field goal shooter. He led the NBA in scoring seven times, field goal percentage nine times, minutes played eight times, rebounding eleven times, and assists once. Chamberlain is most remembered for his 100-point game, which is widely considered one of basketball's greatest records. Decades after his record, many NBA teams did not even average 100 points. 

In high school and college, he was Mr. Basketball USA, NCAA Tournament Most Outstanding Player in 1957, and twice consensus first-team All-American in 1957 and 1958. His number 13 was retired by the Kansas Jayhawks, Harlem Globetrotters, Golden State Warriors, Philadelphia 76ers, and Los Angeles Lakers.  Chamberlain ultimately won two NBA championships, four regular-season Most Valuable Player (MVP) awards, the Rookie of the Year award, one Finals MVP award, and one All-Star Game MVP award, and he was selected to thirteen All-Star Games and ten All-NBA Teams (seven First and three Second teams). He also twice made All-Defensive First Team. 

During his NBA career, Chamberlain committed few fouls despite his rugged play in the post, and he never fouled out of a regular-season or playoff game in his 14-year NBA career. His career average was only two fouls per game despite having averaged 45.8 minutes per game over his career. He had five seasons where he committed less than two fouls per game, with a career-low of 1.5 fouls during the 1962 season, in which he also averaged 50.4 points per game. His fouls per 36 minutes (a statistic used to compare players that average vastly different minutes) was a remarkable 1.6 per game. 

Chamberlain's game evolved over the years. Chamberlain's Lakers coach Bill Sharman said: "First he was a scorer. Then he was a rebounder and assist man. Then with our great Laker team in 1972, he concentrated on the defensive end." During his two championship seasons, Chamberlain led the league in rebounding, while his scoring decreased. During his first championship season, his assists also increased, recording two back-to-back seasons with eight assists per game, and winning one assist title. By 1971–72, at age 35 and running less, his game had transformed to averaging only nine shots per game compared to the 40 in his record-setting 1961–62 season. During Chamberlain's time, defensive statistics like blocks and steals had not been recorded yet.  According to Sixers general manager Jack Ramsay, "Harvey [Pollack] said he used to tell one of his statisticians to keep track of Wilt's blocks in big games. ... One night, they got up to 25." 

For his feats, Chamberlain was enshrined in the Naismith Memorial Basketball Hall of Fame in 1978, named part of the NBA 35th Anniversary Team in 1980, one of the 50 Greatest Players in NBA History in 1996, and was ranked No. 13 in ESPN's list "Top North American Athletes of the Century" in 1999.  He was voted the second best center of all time by ESPN behind Kareem Abdul-Jabbar in 2007, and was ranked No. 2 in Slams "Top 50 NBA Players of All-Time in NBA History" in 2009, and No. 6 in ESPN's list of the top 74 NBA players of all time in 2020, the third best center of all-time behind Abdul-Jabbar and Bill Russell. In 2022, he was ranked No. 5 in ESPN's list of the NBA 75th Anniversary Team, and No. 6 in a similar list by The Athletic.

Rule changes
Chamberlain's impact on the game is reflected in the fact that he was directly responsible for several rule changes in the NBA, including widening the lane to try to keep big men farther away from the basket, instituting offensive goaltending, banning dunking to convert free throws, and revising rules governing inbounding the ball, such as making it against the rules to inbound the ball over the backboard. In basketball history, pundits have stated that the only other player who forced such a massive change of rules is 6'10" Minneapolis Lakers center George Mikan, who played a decade before Chamberlain and also caused many rule changes designed to thwart dominant centers, such as widening the lane and defensive goaltending.

Chamberlain–Russell rivalry

The on-court rivalry between Chamberlain and his arch nemesis Bill Russell is cited as one of the greatest of all time. Russell won 11 NBA titles in his career while Chamberlain won two. Chamberlain was named All-NBA First Team seven times to Russell's three, but Russell was named the NBA MVP—then selected by players and not the press—five times against Chamberlain's four.  Russell's Celtics won seven of eight playoff series against Chamberlain's Warriors, 76ers, and Lakers teams, and went 57–37 against them in the regular season and 29–20 in the playoffs. Russell's teams won all four series-deciding seventh games against Chamberlain's; by a combined margin of nine points. 

The comparison between the two is often simplified to a great player (Chamberlain) versus a player who makes his team great (Russell), an individualist against a team player. In 1960–1961, when Chamberlain averaged 50.4 points per game, he said that Boston did not rely on Russell's scoring, and he could concentrate on defense and rebounding. He wished people would understand that their roles were different. Chamberlain said: "I've got to hit forty points or so, or this team is in trouble. I must score—understand? After that I play defense and get the ball off the boards. I try to do them all, best I can, but scoring comes first." Chamberlain outscored Russell 30 to 14.2 and outrebounded him 28.2 to 22.9 in the regular season, and he outscored him 25.7 to 14.9 and outrebounded him 28 to 24.7 in the playoffs as well.

However, Russell and Chamberlain were friends in private life. Russell never considered Chamberlain his rival and disliked the term, preferring competitors, and also said that they rarely talked about basketball when they were alone. When Chamberlain died in 1999, Chamberlain's nephew stated that Russell was the second person to whom he was ordered to break the news. While previously friends, after Russell criticized Chamberlain for his performance during Game 7 of the 1969 NBA Finals, the two did not speak for two decades. Russell apologized privately to him and later publicly in a 1997 joint interview with Bob Costas. The 1969 NBA Finals is arguably the biggest stain on Chamberlain's career, as supporters of Chamberlain held Russell won more only because he had better teammates; however, in this finals, Chamberlain's team was favored and lost.

Reputation as a loser
Although Chamberlain racked up some of the most impressive statistics in the history of Northern American professional sports, Chamberlain was often called selfish and a loser because he won only two NBA championships and lost seven out of eight playoff series against the Celtics teams of his rival Bill Russell. Frank Deford of ESPN said that Chamberlain was caught in a no-win situation: "If you win, everybody says, 'Well, look at him, he's that big.' If you lose, everybody says, 'How could he lose, a guy that size?'"  Quoting coach Alex Hannum's explanation of his situation, Chamberlain often said: "Nobody roots for Goliath." 

Rick Barry wrote “I’ll say what most players feel, which is that Wilt is a loser…He is terrible in big games. He knows he is going to lose and be blamed for the loss, so he dreads it, and you can see it in his eyes; and anyone who has ever played with him will agree with me, regardless of whether they would admit it publicly... When it comes down to the closing minutes of a tough game, an important game, he doesn’t want the ball, he doesn’t want any part of the pressure. It is at these times that greatness is determined and Wilt doesn’t have it. There is no way you can compare him to a pro like a Bill Russell or a Jerry West...these are clutch competitors.”

Chamberlain's main weakness was his notoriously poor free-throw shooting, a .511 career average, the third lowest in NBA history, with a low of .380 over the 1967–68 season. He later acknowledged that he was a "psycho case" in this matter. Much like later center Shaquille O'Neal, Chamberlain would be fouled intentionally, and was a target of criticism because of it. Countless suggestions were offered; he shot them underhanded, one-handed, two-handed, from the side of the circle, from well behind the line, and even banked it in. Coach Hannum once suggested he shoot his famous fadeaway jumper as a free throw, but Chamberlain feared drawing more attention to his one great failing. 

Despite his foul line woes, Chamberlain set the NBA record, later tied by Adrian Dantley, for most free throws made (28) using the underhand technique in a regular-season game in his 1962 100-point game. Chamberlain later said that he was too embarrassed by the underhand technique to continue using it, even though it consistently gave him better results. Chamberlain even once stated that he intentionally missed free throws so a teammate could get the rebound and score two points instead of one.

Personal life

Star status
Chamberlain was the first big earner of basketball; he immediately became the highest-paid player upon entering the NBA. He was basketball's first player to earn at least $100,000 a year and earned an unprecedented $1.5 million during his Lakers years. As a Philadelphia 76er, he could afford to rent a New York apartment and commute to Philadelphia. In addition, he would often stay out late into the night and wake up at noon.

Jazz composer Thad Jones named the music composition "Big Dipper" after Chamberlain.  When he became a Laker, Chamberlain built a million-dollar mansion in Bel-Air named after Ursa Major, as a play on his nickname "The Big Dipper". It had a 2,200-pound pivot as a front door and contained great displays of luxury. Cherry describes his house as a miniature Playboy Mansion, where he regularly held parties and lived out his later-notorious sex life. This was also helped by the fact that Chamberlain was a near-insomniac who often simply skipped sleeping. Designed according to his preferences, the house was constructed with no right angles, and had an X-rated room with mirrored walls and a fur-covered waterbed. Chamberlain lived alone, relying on a great deal of automated gadgets, with two cats named Zip and Zap and several Great Dane dogs as company. In addition, Chamberlain drove a Ferrari, a Bentley, and had a Le Mans-style car called Searcher One designed and built at a cost of $750,000 in 1996.

Following his death in 1999, Chamberlain's estate was valued at $25 million.

Love life

Although Chamberlain was shy and insecure as a teenager, he became well known for his womanizing when he was an adult. As his lawyer Seymour "Sy" Goldberg put it: "Some people collect stamps, Wilt collected women." Swedish Olympic high jumper Annette Tånnander, who met him when he was 40 and she was 19, remembers him as a pick-up artist who was extremely confident yet respectful, saying: "I think Wilt hit on everything that moved ... he never was bad or rude." Los Angeles Times columnist David Shaw alleged that Chamberlain was "rude and sexist toward his own date, as he usually was", during a dinner with Shaw and his wife; he added that at one point Chamberlain left the table to get the phone number of an attractive woman at a nearby table.

In Chamberlain's second book, A View from Above, he claimed to have had sex with twenty thousand women. According to his contemporary Rod Roddewig, Chamberlain documented his love life using a Day-Timer. Every time Chamberlain went to bed with a different woman, he put a check in his Day-Timer. Over a ten-day period, there were 23 checks in the book, which would be a rate of 2.3 women per day. Chamberlain divided that number in half, to be conservative and to correct for degrees of variation. He then multiplied that number by the number of days he had been alive at the time minus 15 years. That was how the 20,000 number came into existence. 

In response to public backlash regarding his promiscuity, Chamberlain later emphasized that "the point of using the number was to show that sex was a great part of my life as basketball was a great part of my life. That's the reason why I was single." In a 1999 interview shortly before his death, he regretted not having explained the sexual climate at the time of his escapades and warned other men who admired him for it, with the closing words from the chapter of the same book: "With all of you men out there who think that having a thousand different ladies is pretty cool, I have learned in my life I've found out that having one woman a thousand different times is much more satisfying." Chamberlain also acknowledged that he never came close to marrying and had no intention of raising any children.

In 2015, a man named Aaron Levi came forward claiming to be Chamberlain's son based on non-identifying papers from his adoption and information from his biological mother. As Chamberlain's sister refused to provide DNA evidence for testing, Levi's claim is not conclusive.

Relationships
Cherry says that although Chamberlain was an egotist, he had good relationships with many contemporaries and enjoyed a great deal of respect. He was especially lauded for his good rapport with his fans, often providing tickets and signing autographs. Jack Ramsay recalled that Chamberlain regularly took walks in downtown Philadelphia and acknowledged honking horns with the air of a man enjoying all the attention. Jerry West called him a "complex ... very nice person", and NBA rival Jack McMahon even said: "The best thing that happened to the NBA is that God made Wilt a nice person ... he could have killed us all with his left hand." Celtics contemporary Bob Cousy assumed that if Chamberlain had been less fixated on being popular, he would have been meaner and able to win more titles. 

During most of his NBA career, Chamberlain was good friends with Bill Russell. Chamberlain often invited Russell over to Thanksgiving and visited Russell's place, where conversation mostly concerned Russell's electric trains. As the championship count became increasingly lopsided, the relationship got strained and turned hostile after Russell accused Chamberlain of "copping out" in the notorious Game 7 of the 1969 NBA Finals. The two reconciled after two decades, but Chamberlain maintained a level of bitterness, regretted that he had not been "more physical" with Russell in their games, and privately continued accusing his rival for intellectualizing basketball in a negative way.

More hostile was Chamberlain's relationship with fellow center Kareem Abdul-Jabbar, eleven years his junior. Although Abdul-Jabbar idolized him as a teenager and was once part of his inner circle, the student–mentor bond deteriorated into intense mutual loathing, especially after Chamberlain retired. Chamberlain often criticized Abdul-Jabbar for a perceived lack of scoring, rebounding, and defense. Abdul-Jabbar accused Chamberlain of being a traitor to the black race for his Republican political leanings, support of Richard Nixon, and relationships with white women. When Abdul-Jabbar broke his all-time scoring record in 1984, Chamberlain criticized his game and called on him to retire. When Abdul-Jabbar published his autobiography in 1990, he wrote a paper titled "To Wilt Chumperlane", in which he stated: "Now that I am done playing, history will remember me as someone who helped teammates to win, while you will be remembered as a crybaby, a loser, and a quitter." Their relationship remained mostly strained until Chamberlain's death.

Politics
Chamberlain denounced the Black Panthers Party and other black nationalist movements in the late 1960s, and he supported Republican Richard Nixon in the 1968 and 1972 presidential elections. Chamberlain accompanied Nixon to the funeral of Martin Luther King Jr., and he considered himself a Republican.

Sexual assault allegation
In 2021, Cassandra Peterson, who is primarily known for her alter ego Elvira, Mistress of the Dark, alleged in her memoir Yours Cruelly, Elvira: Memoirs of the Mistress of the Dark that Chamberlain had sexually assaulted her during a party at his mansion in the 1970s. Chamberlain allegedly forced her to perform oral sex after offering to show her a closet containing his NBA jerseys. Peterson had stated that she had blamed herself and was almost "convinced that I was a very bad person for letting that happen", until the Me Too movement made her rethink the experience. Peterson felt that the assault was "creepier" because Chamberlain had been a personal friend.

See also

 List of basketball players who have scored 100 points in a single game
 List of National Basketball Association annual field goal percentage leaders
 List of National Basketball Association annual minutes leaders
 List of National Basketball Association annual rebounding leaders
 List of National Basketball Association career free throw scoring leaders
 List of National Basketball Association career minutes played leaders
 List of National Basketball Association career playoff free throw scoring leaders
 List of National Basketball Association career playoff rebounding leaders
 List of National Basketball Association career playoff scoring leaders
 List of National Basketball Association career rebounding leaders
 List of National Basketball Association career scoring leaders
 List of National Basketball Association franchise career scoring leaders
 List of National Basketball Association longest winning streaks
 List of National Basketball Association rookie single-season rebounding leaders
 List of National Basketball Association rookie single-season scoring leaders
 List of National Basketball Association single-game assists leaders
 List of National Basketball Association single-game playoff scoring leaders
 List of National Basketball Association single-game rebounding leaders
 List of National Basketball Association single-game scoring leaders
 List of National Basketball Association single-season rebounding leaders
 List of National Basketball Association single-season scoring leaders
 List of NCAA Division I men's basketball players with 30 or more rebounds in a game

Notes

References

Works cited

Further reading

External links

 Career statistics and coach information from Basketball-Reference.com
 
 
 Wilt Chamberlain at the Kansas Jayhawks men's basketball
 NBA Chamberlain's summary at NBA.com
 KU Chamberlain's summary at the Kansas Jayhawks men's basketball
 4th-quarter radio broadcast of Chamberlain's 100-point game at Random House
 How Chamberlain's 100-point game almost went unrecorded at Weekend America, June 4, 2005
 Image of Chamberlain making a dunk during a Los Angeles Lakers vs. Milwaukee Bucks game in 1971 at the Los Angeles Times Photographic Archive (Collection 1429), UCLA Library Special Collections, Charles E. Young Research Library, University of California, Los Angeles

 
1936 births
1999 deaths
African-American basketball coaches
African-American basketball players
African-American volleyball players
All-American college men's basketball players
American Basketball Association announcers
American men's basketball players
American men's volleyball players
Basketball coaches from Pennsylvania
Basketball players from Philadelphia
Centers (basketball)
Harlem Globetrotters players
Kansas Jayhawks men's basketball players
Los Angeles Lakers players
Naismith Memorial Basketball Hall of Fame inductees
National Basketball Association All-Stars
National Basketball Association broadcasters
National Basketball Association players with retired numbers
Pennsylvania Republicans
Philadelphia 76ers players
Philadelphia Warriors draft picks
Philadelphia Warriors players
Player-coaches
People from Bel Air, Los Angeles
San Diego Conquistadors coaches
San Francisco Warriors players
Track and field people from California
Track and field athletes from Pennsylvania